Tanaorhinus is a genus of moths in the family Geometridae. It was described by Arthur Gardiner Butler in 1879.

Species
Tanaorhinus celebensis Yazaki, 1995
Tanaorhinus dohertyi Prout, 1932
Tanaorhinus formosana Okano, 1959
Tanaorhinus kina Swinhoe, 1893
Tanaorhinus malayanus Inoue, 1992
Tanaorhinus philippinensis Yazaki, 1995
Tanaorhinus rafflesii (Moore, 1860)
Tanaorhinus reciprocata (Walker, 1861)
Tanaorhinus tibeta Chu, 1982
Tanaorhinus unipuncta Warren, 1899
Tanaorhinus viridiluteata (Walker, 1861)
Tanaorhinus waterstradti Prout, 1933

References
Geometridae genus list at Butterflies and Moths of the World of the Natural History Museum

Geometrinae